Ballaghline is a townland on the western seaboard of County Clare, Ireland. It is 6 kilometres east of Lisdoonvarna, on the outskirts of Doolin.

References

Towns and villages in County Clare